Yosyf Penyak (born 31 May 1984, in Uzhhorod) is a Ukrainian snowboarder, specializing in  parallel slalom. He represented Ukraine at the 2010 Winter Olympics in Vancouver and 2014 Winter Olympics in Sochi.

Penyak made his World Cup debut in October 2004. As of February 2014, he has the best result 8th in parallel slalom in 2008/09 at Kreischberg.

Performances

World Cup

Positions

External links
 
 http://www.olympic.org/athletes?search=1&game=226691&countryname=ukraine&page=3
 
 

1984 births
Living people
Sportspeople from Uzhhorod
Olympic snowboarders of Ukraine
Snowboarders at the 2010 Winter Olympics
Snowboarders at the 2014 Winter Olympics
Ukrainian male snowboarders